The Baeksang Arts Award for Best New Director – Film is annually presented at the Baeksang Arts Awards ceremony.

List of winners

Sources

External links 
  

Baeksang Arts Awards (film)
Directorial debut film awards